Eta Gamma Delta is a Puerto Rican sorority established in 1928.

History
In March 1928 a group of young ladies enrolled in the University of Puerto Rico at Rio Piedras founded Eta Gamma Delta Sorority.  Their first president was Margarita Ortiz Toro. During the presidency of Beatriz del Toro in 1929 the sorority was recognized by University Authorities. By 1932 an alumnus chapter called "Capitulo Pasivo" was organized in San Juan during the presidency of Conchita Santana Campos.

On 1940 on the (Colegio de Agricultura y Artes Mecanicas) now the University of Puerto Rico at Mayagüez Gilda Cernuda, Socorro Gaztambide, Aida Gauthier, Iris Ramírez, Catín Rllán, Doris Pérez and others founded Delta Phi Omega sorority, it was the first sorority at the Campus.  On April 14, 1941, the then president of the Alpha chapter of Eta Gamma Delta, Annie Bonar, inviting this new group to join the now well-known Eta Gamma Delta Sorority and become their Beta chapter.  After several meetings and visits by the Eta sisters, all the Delta Phi Omega sisters took the formal initiation and became part of Eta Gamma Delta.

On 1943 the Alumni chapter at Mayagüez was established, calling itself the (Zona Beta), their first president was Virginia Ramírez.  It was then that the need for a central governing body became apparent, thus on 1944 the first (Directiva General) was established, Eleonor Lawton was its first president.

In March 1946, the ladies of Delta Omega Mu Sorority met with one of the Members of Eta Gamma Delta, Sarah Torres Peralta. The purpose of their visit was to discuss with her the idea of Eta Gamma Delta establishing the Gamma chapter in the Interamerican University at San Germán where Delta Omega Mu was located.  After several meetings and discussions the ladies of Delta Omega Mu and others of the beta chapter at Mayagüez who studied at the Interamerican became the Gamma chapter of Eta Gamma Delta.   Their first chapter president was Rosarito Armstrong.

On 1949 the Delta chapter was founded the Catholic University at Ponce, the first chapter president was Rosarito Armstrong the same sister who had been the first president of Gamma chapter.  In 1955 an alumnus chapter (Zona) was founded at Ponce; its first president was Práxes Torres de García.  On 1990 the Zeta chapter was established at the University of Sagrado Corazon.  By February 1990 the Kappa Zone was established in Arecibo.  On 1991 on an annual convention the Kappa chapter was re-instated.  Presently Zone Omega was established in 2007 in the state of Florida.

Chapters

 Alpha Activo - San Juan
 Zona Alpha - San Juan
 Beta Activo - Mayagüez
 Zona Beta - Mayagüez
 Delta Activo - Ponce
 Zona Delta - Ponce
 Gamma Activo - San Germán
 Zona Gamma - San Germán
 Zona Omega - Orlando, Florida
 Zona Tau - Tampa, Florida
 Zona Kappa - Arecibo
 Zona Epsilon - Yauco

See also 
Concilio Interfraternitario Puertorriqueño de la Florida
Puerto Rican fraternities and sororities

Footnotes

Fraternities and sororities in Puerto Rico
1928 establishments in Puerto Rico
Student organizations established in 1928
Latino fraternities and sororities